This is a list of cities and districts of Okinawa Prefecture, Japan:

Cities 
Ginowan
Ishigaki
Itoman
Miyakojima (Formerly Hirara, Gusukube, Irabu, Shimoji, Ueno)
Nago
Naha (capital)
Nanjō (Formerly Sashiki, Chinen, Ōzato, and Tamagusuku)
Okinawa
Tomigusuku
Urasoe
Uruma (Formerly Gushikawa, Ishikawa, Katsuren, and Yonashiro)

Districts 
Kunigami
Ginoza
Higashi
Ie
Kin
Kunigami
Motobu
Nakijin
On'na
Oogimi
Miyako
Tarama
Nakagami
Chatan
Kadena
Kitanakagusuku
Nakagusuku
Nishihara
Yomitan
Shimajiri
Aguni
Haebaru
Iheya
Izena
Kitadaitou
Kumejima
Minamidaitō
Tokashiki
Tonaki
Yaese (Formerly Gushikami and Kochinda)
Yonabaru
Zamami
Yaeyama
Taketomi
Yonaguni

Cities in Okinawa Prefecture